De Marathon is a 2012 Dutch comedy film directed by Diederick Koopal.

Plot
Gerard is a car garage owner in Rotterdam. He works there with his friends Kees, Nico and Leo. The Egyptian Youssoef also works in the garage.
Nico notices some odd papers in Gerard's office. It turns out that garage has big financial problems, which Gerard did not want the others to know about. Later Youssoef tells his collegeas that he used to be a marathon runner, and made a decent living off off it from sponsorships, before he got his foot injured. The men decide they want to participate in the yearly Rotterdam  Marathon to get rid off their debts. Their attempts to secure a sponsorship do not succeed however.
After a visit to the hospital Gerard learns that he has terminal cancer. He does not want anyone of his friends and family to know because he want life to go on as normal.
The men convince Youssoef to get them in touch with his uncle and old sponsor, Houssein. Gerard makes a deal: if he, Kees, Nico and Leo all finish the marathon, they get € 40,000, enough to pay their debts. If they don't, Houssein gets the car garage.
The next six months they train for the marathon, and Youssoef becomes their coach. Each of them has difficulty adapting to the new lifestyle without beer, smoking and pastries, as well as their dealing with their own personal problems. After they fail to show up to a race in Amsterdam, Youssoef almost quits. The men apologise and become more strict in their training.
On the day of the marathon everyone is present. Kees, Nico and Leo finish it without any major problems, but Gerard falls behind due to his cancer and collapses a short distance before the finish line. He later dies in the hospital. This is the first time that any of his friends learn that he had cancer, eventually deciding to sneak his dead body out of the hospital and push him over the finish line in a wheelchair. The film ends with the remaining friends still working at the garage, with Gerard's teenage son joining them as a new mechanic while Gerard's ashes sit in a jar against the wall.

Cast
Stefan de Walle - Gerard
Frank Lammers - Kees
Marcel Hensema - Nico
Martin van Waardenberg - Leo
Mimoun Oaïssa - Youssoef

References

External links 

2012 comedy films
2012 films
Films set in Rotterdam
Dutch comedy films